"Electra" (also spelled as "Elektra") is the twelfth and final single by heavy metal band Dio. It was released with the band's "Tournado Box Set" in early 2010, before Ronnie James Dio's death on May 16, 2010. It was the last song recorded by the band before that date as well.

The song would later see wider release as part of the posthumous compilation The Very Beast of Dio Vol. 2 in 2012, and on the deluxe edition of Magica in 2013.

Background
In an interview with Hit the Lights series creator Robert Gray, Dio was asked about the Magica II & III album, which Dio responded: "[...]I've been doing a lot of work on the [new] 'Magica' album. I believe we'll release one of the songs from 'Magica' that I decided to put together, so that whatever package we happen to hand to the people when we're out there, it's a lot more attractive with one thing they've never heard before. I guess you could call it a teaser. It's a really good song [called "Electra"], and part of the whole 'Magica' trilogy. It's sometimes hard for it to stand alone, but I did write an explanation of what it was about, and what the song is about, and that it's just a brief glimpse into what will be 'Magica' again. There's some plans to do that - there are some special plans."

The song was originally going to debut during the band's European tour, but the tour was eventually canceled, due to Ronnie James Dio's diagnosis of stomach cancer. "Electra" is the only song so far that has been released from the unfinished albums Magica II & III.

Reception
Chris Coplan of Consequence of Sound praised the song, stating that "Dio takes things to a whole new level. There’s a freshness and an excitement to the track. And while you can vaguely tell Dio is up in there in years, it gives the vocals a kind of story to them, a feeling of some noble metal statesman once more addressing his kingdom."

Personnel
Ronnie James Dio - vocals
Doug Aldrich - guitars
Rudy Sarzo - bass
Simon Wright - drums
Scott Warren - keyboards

Additional personnel
Wyn Davis - engineer
Brett Chassen - assistant engineer
Adam Arnold - assistant engineer

References

External links
 Dio's official website

2010 singles
Dio (band) songs
Songs written by Ronnie James Dio
2009 songs